Pins and Needles is a 2007 album by Savatage guitarist Chris Caffery.

Track listing 
 "Pins and Needles" (Chris Caffery) - 4:47
 "66" (Caffery) - 4:40
 "Reach Out and Torment Again" (Caffery, Nik Chinboukas) - 3:35
 "Walls" (Caffery, Chinboukas) - 5:35
 "Y.G.B.F.K.M." (Caffery) - 4:08
 "It's S-A-D" (Caffery, Chinboukas, Jon Oliva) - 4:43
 "Chained" (Caffery, Chinboukas) - 4:40
 "WORMS" (Caffery) - 4:08
 "The Sign of the Crossed" (Caffery, Chinboukas) - 4:14
 "The Time" (Caffery, Chinboukas) - 3:25
 "Mettle Eastern" (Caffery) - 4:12
 "In the Midst" (Caffery) - 2:10
 "Quaaludio" (Caffery) - 1:35
 "The Temple" (Caffery, Chinboukas) - 5:34
 "Once Upon a Time" (Caffery, Paul Morris) - 4:52 (limited edition bonus track)

Credits
Chris Caffery - all vocals, all guitars, bass guitars, keyboards, sax solo on "Worms", additional percussion, producer, engineer
Yael - drums
Nick Douglas - bass guitars
Paul Morris - piano, keyboards
Dave Eggar - cello, string arrangements
Phil Caffery - drums on "Once Upon a Time"
Lucia Micarelli - violin on "Mettle East"
Rachel - violin on "Once Upon a Time"
Ferdy Doernberg - keyboard solo on "Mettle East"
Alex Skolnick - ending guitar solo on "It's SAD"
Marcus DeLoach - opera vocals on "The Time"
Paul LaPlaca - additional keyboards, engineer 
Nik Chinboukas - additional keyboards, additional drums, producer, engineer, mixing
Roger Lian - mastering at Masterdisk, New York City

References

2005 albums
Chris Caffery albums